Ivan Ljubičić was the defending champion, and defended his title defeating Fernando González 6–3, 6–4, 7–5 in the final.

Seeds

Draw

Finals

Top half

Bottom half

External links
Draw
Qualifying Draw

BA-CA-TennisTrophy - Singles